George Victor (14 January 1831 – 12 May 1893) was the 3rd sovereign Prince of the German state of Waldeck and Pyrmont.

He was born in Bad Arolsen the son of George II, Prince of Waldeck and Pyrmont and his wife Princess Emma of Anhalt-Bernburg-Schaumburg-Hoym. He succeeded as prince originally under the guardianship of his mother on 15 May 1845 following the death of his father.

He died of pneumonia in Marienbad, Bohemia and was succeeded by his eldest son Friedrich.

Family
George Victor was first married on 26 September 1853 in Wiesbaden to Princess Helena of Nassau, daughter of William, Duke of Nassau. They had seven children:

 Princess Sophie (27 July 1854 – 5 August 1869); died of tuberculosis at fifteen.
 Princess Pauline (19 October 1855 – 3 July 1925) married Alexis, Prince of Bentheim and Steinfurt.
 Princess Marie (23 May 1857 – 30 April 1882) who married Prince William, later King William II of Württemberg.
 Princess Emma (2 August 1858 – 20 March 1934) who married King William III of the Netherlands. The present Dutch royal family descends from this marriage.
 Princess Helena (17 February 1861 – 1 September 1922) who married British Prince Leopold, Duke of Albany. Amongst her children was Charles Edward, last reigning Duke of Saxe-Coburg and Gotha. The present Swedish royal family descends from this marriage.  
 Prince Friedrich (20 January 1865 – 26 May 1946), last reigning prince of Waldeck and Pyrmont, married Princess Bathildis of Schaumburg-Lippe
 Princess Elisabeth (6 September 1873 – 23 November 1961) married Alexander, Prince of Erbach-Schönberg.

His second marriage took place in Luisenlund on 29 April 1891 to Princess Louise of Schleswig-Holstein-Sonderburg-Glücksburg. From this marriage he had one son who was killed in action shortly after outbreak of the First World War.
 Prince Wolrad (1892–1914)

Orders and decorations
  Ascanian duchies: Grand Cross of the Order of Albert the Bear, 30 November 1848
 : Grand Cross of the House and Merit Order of Duke Peter Friedrich Ludwig, with Golden Crown, 12 August 1845
    Ernestine duchies: Grand Cross of the Saxe-Ernestine House Order, August 1852
 : Grand Cross of the Grand Ducal Hessian Order of Ludwig, 3 April 1853
 : Knight of the Order of the Gold Lion of the House of Nassau, April 1859
  Kingdom of Prussia:
 Knight of the Order of the Black Eagle, 1 February 1868
 Grand Commander's Cross of the Royal House Order of Hohenzollern, 5 December 1878
   Sweden-Norway:
 Grand Cross of the Royal Norwegian Order of Saint Olav, 5 September 1861
 Knight of the Royal Order of the Seraphim, 8 October 1872
 : Grand Cross of the Order of the Württemberg Crown, 1872
 : Knight of the House Order of Fidelity, 1874
 : Honorary Knight Grand Cross (civil division) of the Most Honourable Order of the Bath, 1882

Ancestry

References

1831 births
1893 deaths
People from Bad Arolsen
Princes of Waldeck and Pyrmont
House of Waldeck and Pyrmont
19th-century Prussian military personnel
Generals of Infantry (Prussia)
Honorary Knights Grand Cross of the Order of the Bath
Military personnel from Hesse